The Women's 1000 metres competition at the 2021 World Single Distances Speed Skating Championships was held on 13 February 2021.

Results
The race was started at 15:17.

References

Women's 1000 metres
2021 in women's speed skating